The Landulfids or Atenulfings were a noble family of Lombardic origin in the ninth through eleventh centuries. They were descended from Landulf I of Capua, whose own ancestry is unknown and who died in 843. The dynasty produced a line of princes which ruled most of southern Italy at one time or another and even one pope, Victor III. 

In 839, a civil war broke out in the Principality of Benevento. Landulf of Capua supported Siconulf in the war and when the Emperor Louis II forced a division of the principality on the claimants in 849, Capua was assigned to the Principality of Salerno. But Landulf's heirs aimed to make themselves independent of any princely authority. By 860–861 this task was essentially complete and Capua was independent county.

Genealogy
Landulf I the Old (died 843), Gastald of Capua 
Lando I (died 860), Count of Capua
Lando II (died 884), Count of Capua
Pando the Rapacious (died 862), Count of Capua
Pandenulf (died 882), Count of Capua
Landenulf, Bishop of Capua
Landulf II (died 879), Bishop and Count of Capua
Landenulf, Count of Teano
Lando III (died 885), Count of Capua
Landenful I (died 887), Count of Capua
Atenulf I the Great (died 910), Prince of Capua and Benevento
Landulf III Antipater (died 943), Prince of Capua and Benevento
Atenulf III (died 943), Prince of Capua and Benevento
Landulf IV the Red (died 961), Prince of Capua and Benevento
Pandulf I Ironhead (died 981), Prince of Capua, Benevento, and Salerno and Duke of Spoleto and Camerino
Landulf VI (died 982), Prince of Capua and Benevento
Pandulf II (died 982), Prince of Salerno
Landenulf II (died 993), Prince of Capua
Laidulf (died 999), Prince of Capua
Atenulf (died 982)
John, Archbishop of Capua
Landulf V (died 968), Prince of Capua and Benevento
Landulf VII di Sant'Agata (died 1007), Prince of Capua
Pandulf II the Black (died 1022), Prince of Capua
Pandulf II the Old (died 1014), Prince of Capua and Benevento
Pandulf IV the Wolf (died 1050), Prince of Capua
Landulf VIII, Prince of Capua
Pandulf VI Gualo (died 1057), Prince of Capua
Adelgrima, married Rainald, Count of the Marsi
Maria, married Atenulf I of Gaeta
Sikelgaita of Capua, married Lando of Aquino (brother of Atenulf I of Gaeta)
Landulf V (died 1033), Prince of Benevento
Pandulf III (died 1059), Prince of Benevento
Landulf VI (died 1077), Prince of Benevento
Pandulf IV (died 1073), Prince of Benevento
Atenulf
Atenulf, Abbot of Montecassino
Maria, married Sergius III of Amalfi
Gaitelgrima, married Guaimar III of Salerno
Atenulf II (died 941), Prince of Capua and Benevento
Landulf, Count of Conza
Guaimar, Count of the Marsi
Indulf, Count of Sarni
Landulf
Landenulf (died 971), Count of Lauris
Landulf
Gaitelgrima, married Guaimar II of Salerno

Sources
Stasser, Thierry. "Où sont les femmes? Prosopographie des femmes des familles princières et ducales en Italie méridionale depuis la chute du royaume lombard (774) jusqu’à l’installation des Normands (env. 1100)." Prosopon: The Journal of Prosopography, 2006.

Lombard families